NLL draft may refer to:
National Lacrosse League expansion draft
National Lacrosse League dispersal draft
National Lacrosse League Entry Draft